The WABA League is a top-level regional basketball league, featuring female teams from Serbia, Montenegro, Bosnia and Herzegovina, Bulgaria, Slovenia. In the Regular season was played with 8 teams and play a dual circuit system, each with each one game at home and away. The four best teams at the end of the regular season were placed in the Final Four. The regular season began on 14 October 2020 and it will end on 4 March 2021.

Vojvodina 021 informed the Board of the WABA League 23 february 2021 that due to obligations in the national championship and the Serbian Cup, it is not able to play the remaining seven games of the 2020-21 WABA League regular season. It means that Vojvodina 021 withdraws from the 2020-21 WABA League.

As per the Official Basketball Rules, the games (played and unplayed) were awarded to their respective opponents with a score of 20-0. Furthermore, the forfeiting team Vojvodina 021 will receive 0 classification points in the standings.

Standings

Fixtures and results
All times given below are in Central European Time (for the matches played in Bulgaria is time expressed in Eastern European Time).

Game 1

Game 2

Game 3

Game 4

Game 5

Game 6

Game 7

Game 8

Game 9

Game 10

Game 11

Game 12

Game 13

Game 14

References

External links
Official website

Regular season